Santa Victoria Este is an Argentine town in northeastern Salta Province in the Department of Rivadavia. According to the 2010 Census, it has a population of 1,283.

Climate

References

Populated places in Salta Province

de:Santa Victoria Oeste